Adrien Coulomb (born 4 October 1990) is a French professional footballer who plays as a midfielder for Marignane Gignac.

Club career
Coulomb made his professional debut in October 2013, in a 1–0 Ligue 2 defeat against Istres.

References

External links
 
 
 Adrien Coulomb foot-national.com Profile

1990 births
Living people
Footballers from Marseille
Association football midfielders
French footballers
Ligue 2 players
Championnat National players
AC Arlésien players
Marignane Gignac Côte Bleue FC players